Kyeong Duk Kang (born February 9, 1988) is a Korean American professional baseball outfielder who is currently a free agent. He is the first South Korean-born baseball player to be selected in the MLB draft.

Career
With his parents, Kang moved to the United States at age 14 from South Korea. They lived in Alabama, where Kang had an aunt, for two years. They relocated to the Atlanta, area, as his parents could not find work in Alabama. As his parents researched schools in the Atlanta area, they read an article on Jeff Francoeur, who graduated from Parkview High School, and decided to enroll Kang there. His parents moved back to South Korea after Kang's brother graduated from high school in 2007.

The Tampa Bay Devil Rays selected Kang in the 15th round of the 2006 Major League Baseball (MLB) Draft, 439th overall. He became the first South Korean-born baseball player to be selected in an MLB draft. Turning down scholarships from four-year colleges, such as the University of Georgia, Kang attended Chattahoochee Valley Community College, a junior college, where he played college baseball for one season. He signed with the Rays as a draft-and-follow prospect in prior to the 2007 draft. He initially requested a signing bonus of $1 million, but agreed to sign for $75,000.

Kang spent his first two professional seasons with the Princeton Rays in the Rookie-level Appalachian League and Hudson Valley Renegades in the Class-A Short Season New York–Penn League. In 2009, Kang played for the Bowling Green Hot Rods of the Class-A Midwest League, where he led the team with a .307 batting average. During the season, Bowling Green manager, Matt Quatraro raved about Kang's ability and potential: "He's just a good hitter. He is more of a double hitter than a home run hitter, but I can see him hitting 25 homers in the big leagues with a lot of doubles. He has that kind of power. He hasn't shown it yet, but it's there. Watch batting practice and you immediately see the way the ball comes off his bat. He's got a lot of raw talent." In this year, Kang represented the Rays in the All-Star Futures Game.,

In 2010, Kang was promoted once again, to the High-A affiliate Charlotte Stone Crabs in the Florida State League, however this year his batting average dropped over 60 points to .241, and he managed to hit only one home run. When speaking to Kang about the 2010 season, he said "I tried to muscle to ball too much and over swung too often. After having a good year this past season, I started to think too much about hitting homeruns, and I think that got the best of me. Although that season was a huge disappointment, it allowed me to take a step back and not be too aggressive at the plate."

Beginning the 2011 season as a reserve with the Montgomery Biscuits of the Class-AA Southern League, Kang played his way into a starting role  by hitting 11 home runs in the 316 at bats. Diving deeper into the numbers, there was another encouraging sign from Kang in 2011. He had a line drive percentage of 25.6 which was the fourth highest rate in the entire system for players with more than 200 plate appearances. This is indicative of a return to a line drive approach at the plate that as you will see in his scouting report, is the natural result of his swing when he is going well at the dish. He opened the 2012 season with the Biscuits. Kang led the team with 14 homeruns in Double-A, but saw a jump in his strikeout rate, posting 135 strikeouts to 51 walks. He struggled particularly against left handed pitchers, batting just .111 in 90 at bats (.290 against righties in 255 at bats), while striking out 45 times to just 5 walks. In fact, all 14 of his homeruns came against right handed pitchers. [8][9]

To start the 2013 season, Kang was demoted to High-A Charlotte, but quickly found himself back in Montgomery, after slashing .339/.426/.525 in 17 games. He once again led the team with 15 homeruns, and also hit 17 doubles and 7 triples in Double-A. He became the first player to lead Montgomery in homeruns in back-to-back seasons in 60 years. Between two levels, Kang recorded career highs in homeruns (16), total bases (193), and also improved upon his weakness against lefties (.250 vs. 252).[10]

After the 2013 season, Kang became a free agent. On November 18, 2013, he signed a minor league contract with the Baltimore Orioles. He played for the Bowie Baysox of the Class-AA Eastern League in 2014. The Double-A Bowies outfield was extremely crowded all-season long with player such as Dariel Alvarez, Ronald Bermudez, Chih-Hsien Chiang, and Kang struggled to find playing time during the month of April, only playing in 11 games. He was often benched against left handed pitchers, which made it harder for him to find his rhythm. However, with patience, Kang's numbers started looking better during the months of June (.333/.367/.533) and July (.293/.336/.424). Kang saw his numbers dip a bit during the month of August, but his offensive production flourished again towards the end of the season. During the five-game series against the Erie Seawolves from Aug 25 to Aug 28, Kang hit four homeruns to finish strong. Overall, Kang collected 106 hits in 376 at bats, with a slash line of .282/.338/.452 this season. He also had 37 extra base hits (22 doubles, 3 triples, 12 homeruns), 37 RBI, 32 walks and 86 strikeouts.[12] On November 21, 2014 the Atlanta Braves signed Kang to a minor league contract for the 2015 season.

References

External links

1988 births
Living people
Sportspeople from Busan
South Korean baseball players
Baseball outfielders
Princeton Rays players
Hudson Valley Renegades players
Bowling Green Hot Rods players
Charlotte Stone Crabs players
Montgomery Biscuits players
Bowie Baysox players
Chattahoochee Valley Pirates baseball players
South Korean emigrants to the United States